David Carver (born 5 September 1987) is a Mauritian runner who specialises in the marathon. He placed 102nd at the 2016 Olympics and 61st at the 2017 World Championships.

References

External links
 

1987 births
Living people
Mauritian male long-distance runners
Olympic athletes of Mauritius
Athletes (track and field) at the 2016 Summer Olympics
Place of birth missing (living people)
Mauritian male marathon runners